The 1905 Utah Agricultural Aggies football team was an American football team that represented Utah Agricultural College (later renamed Utah State University) during the 1905 college football season. In their fourth season under head coach George P. Campbell, the Aggies compiled a 2–2–1 record and outscored their opponents by a total of 48 to 38.

Schedule

References

Utah Agricultural
Utah State Aggies football seasons
Utah Agricultural Aggies football